The Government Flying Service (GFS) is a disciplined unit and paramilitary flying organisation of the Government of Hong Kong.

The service has its head office in, and operates from, the southwestern end of Hong Kong International Airport at Chek Lap Kok. Before the opening of the Chek Lap Kok airport in 1998, it operated from the old Kai Tak Airport, the former Hong Kong International Airport.

History 
The Government Flying Service was established on 1 April 1993, when Hong Kong was under British rule. It then took over all the non-military operations of the Royal Hong Kong Auxiliary Air Force (RHKAAF), which was an auxiliary unit of the United Kingdom Royal Air Force. After Hong Kong was handed over to the People's Republic of China in 1997, the GFS remained as a government unit of the Hong Kong Special Administrative Region, and is responsible for search and rescue (SAR), air ambulance, firefighting, and police operations.

In 2007, the former dispersal terminal in the old Kai Tak Airport was re-opened as a sub-base, providing refuelling and other supporting services for GFS's helicopters, with a helipad located near the foot of Cheung Yip Street.

In August 2020, a GFS Bombardier Challenger 605 maritime patrol aircraft was believed to have assisted Chinese authorities in intercepting 12 Hong Kongers who were attempting to flee to Taiwan due to increasingly onerous conditions in Hong Kong and enhanced exit controls. The Hong Kong government denied that they had cooperated with Chinese authorities. On December 21, 2020, the United States Bureau of Industry and Security amended the Export Administration Regulations by adding a new ‘Military End User' (MEU) List, as well as the first tranche of 103 entities, which includes 58 Chinese and 45 Russian companies. Government Flying Service was added as one of 103 entities to the MEU List.

Operations 
GFS consists of five divisions:

 Operations Division – all emergency response and operational matters (i.e. search and rescue)
 Training and Standards Division – professional standards and development
 Corporate Safety Division - safety-related initiatives and cross-section safety management matters 
 Engineering Division – maintenance of GFS aircraft and ground-support equipment in accordance with the Civil Aviation Department standards
 Administration Division – general administration, personnel support services

Helicopters can land on five highways in Hong Kong to attend to road related recovery operations. For long-range search and rescue operations, the GFS initially use fixed wing aircraft which then guide helicopters to the location.

Air ambulance service response time (type A+/A) – 20 minutes (within island zone) / 30 minutes (outside island zone)
Search and rescue callout time 0700-2159 -(within 50 nm/92.5 km of GFS HQ) – 1hr / 1hr 40m (with additional/specialized equipment)
Search and rescue callout time 2200-0659 -(within 50 nm/92.5 km of GFS HQ) – 2hr
For SARs outside 50 nm / 92.5 km – add 30mins per 50 nm
Fixed Winged Aircraft 0700-2159 – (within 50 nm/92.5 km of GFS)- 50m, (between 50 nm/92.5 km to 100 nm/185 km of GFS)- 1hr 5m, (beyond 100 nm/185 km of GFS)- add 15m per 50 nm.

Current inventory

Equipment and gear 

Standard equipment for GFS personnel is:
 Flight suit or jumpsuit
 Special operations vests (SOVs) – consists of a small oxygen tank (3 minutes of oxygen), life jacket, small survival/first aid kit.
 Helicopter helmet
 Walkie-talkie
 SABRE 7 (BE549) personal locator beacon
 Gloves

Personnel 
GFS employs 335 personnel:

 235 commissioned/disciplined personnel
 100 civilian personnel

Most of the pilots in the GFS were localised prior to the handover in 1997, as former RAF and other British military personnel departed Hong Kong.

The GFS is led by a Controller, who reports to the Secretary for Security. The current Controller is Captain West WH WU.

Other senior officers of the GFS are:

 Departmental Secretary
 Chief Pilot (Operations)
 Chief Pilot (Training and Standards)
 Chief Pilot (Corporate Safety)
 Chief Aircraft Engineer

Uniform 
Operations uniforms:

 green Jumpsuit or separate Flight jacket and pants - pilot and aircrew
 blue jumpsuit or separate Flight jacket and pants - mechanics and engineers

Dress uniforms:

 light blue shirt (short sleeve for summer and long sleeve for winter) with dark tie dress jacket and pants
 dark skirts for women
 sweaters for men 
 dark windbreaker jacket for summer
 Peaked cap - male and female variations

Rank 
Prior to the creation of the GFS, the ranks within the Royal Hong Kong Auxiliary Air Force were the same as the RAF. The late 1980s and early 1990s saw the transition to local staff in the RHKAAF in preparation for the civil transfer to the GFS role.

Ranking of personnel of the GFS are civilian aviation roles and are as follows:

Pilot II and Cadet Pilot ranks were created in the 1990s for local pilots with less flying experience.

Controllers 
List of past controllers of the GFS:

 Captain Brian Cluer - former RAF fighter pilot and General Manager of Operations, Cathay Pacific
 Captain Brian Butt Yiu-ming - formerly with Royal Hong Kong Auxiliary Air Force and Chief Inspector with Hong Kong Police specializing in the counterfeit detection

Crest 
The current crest of the force was adopted in 1997, prior to which the Hong Kong Coat of Arms was used on GFS aircraft:

 Bauhinia
 Crest with a Chinese dragon, propeller (borrowed from the Royal Hong Kong Auxiliary Air Force crest) and wording GFS
 Motto contain the wording "政府飛行服務隊" with a pair of wings provides a bilingual logo to the agency that was lacking in the previous agency

GFS in the media 
 The service's official theme song, Wishing You Well So Much (多想你好), was sung by Andy Lau in 2003.
 The TVB drama "Always Ready" was filmed inside GFS HQ in 2005 and starred Ekin Cheng.

Incidents 
 26 August 2003 – A Eurocopter EC 155 B1 crashed on a hill at Pak Kung Au near Tung Chung on Lantau Island killing two aircrew (Pilot Pang Fu-kwok and Airman Chan Man-tik).
 27 December 2010 – One of the GFS's Eurocopter Super Puma Mk II helicopters (B-HRN) ditched in Shing Mun Reservoir after the loss of its number 2 engine. It was in the process of collecting water from the reservoir to drop on a hill fire. None of the three crew members were injured. The Civil Aviation Department said on the following day it had retrieved the flight data recorder. Pending a final report, an interim bulletin issued in February 2012 reported that the number 2 engine was correctly shut down automatically by the engine control unit because the turbine had begun to overspeed, because there appeared to be no fault in the turbine or the fuel systems the overspeed was possibly the result of a disconnection of the engine from the main gearbox because of wear to the freewheel unit that connected the two. The Helicopter was rebuilt by the engineering team after it was recovered from the reservoir.

See also 

 Royal Hong Kong Auxiliary Air Force

References

External links 

 
 Government Flying Services as described in Hong Kong Yearbook 2002

Government Flying Service
Aviation in Hong Kong
Public health and safety in Hong Kong
Hong Kong
Air ambulance services in Hong Kong